Dholbajja is a village in the Forbesganj subdivision of Araria district, in the state of Bihar, India. The Pin code is 854318.

References

External links
 
 https://pincode.org.in/bihar/araria/d/dholbazza

Villages in Araria district